Paul Cotte (January 10, 1825 – January 2, 1901) was a French politician. From 1872 until 1881 he served under the Republican Union, and he was on the general counsel of his home town of Salernes from 1871 to 1878.

References

French politicians
1825 births
1901 deaths